The Sterick Building is an office building in Memphis, Tennessee. It was designed by Wyatt C. Hedrick & Co., and was completed in 1930—its name is a contraction of the original owners' names, R.E. Sterling and Wyatt Hedrick. It is a gothic-style tower, 111 m (365 ft) tall with 29 floors. When it opened it 1930 it was called the tallest building in the American South, It was the tallest building in Tennessee until 1957. It is now the fifth-tallest building in Memphis. It stands at the corner of Madison Avenue and North B.B. King Boulevard.

Early history
Once called “the Queen of Memphis” and “the most complex, the most fabulous building in Memphis,” the Sterick Building featured a white stone spire topped with a green tile roof; its own bank, pharmacy, barber shop, and beauty parlor; and stockbrokers' offices. The first three floors were made from granite and limestone. From the lobby, which was said to “rival the beauty of a Moorish castle,” its eight high-speed elevators ferried the building's 2,000+ workers and guests to the upper floors, including the Regency Room restaurant on the top floor.

The original lease of land for the property, dating from the late 1920s, required the $1,500 monthly payment to be paid in gold coin “of standard weight and fineness or its equivalent.”  An unsuccessful 1975 lawsuit by the land owners sought to recalculate the rent at the then-current price of gold, or roughly $13,500 per month.

Decline
As new, more modern office buildings were built in downtown Memphis in the 1960s, the building begin to lose tenants and, despite a number of alterations (including being repainted from its original white and green to yellow and tan), it has been left vacant since the 1980s. It was added to the National Register of Historic Places in 1978.

Recent events
In 2006, the Memphis Center City Commission placed the Sterick Building on its list of "Top Ten Center City Redevelopment Sites". Criteria for inclusion on this list include:
 “A site that is important to the health and vitality of its neighborhood and of Memphis”
 “A site that currently has no solid redevelopment plans on the board”
 “A site with architecture significant in the history of Memphis”
 “A site where redevelopment is seen as a catalyst for future improvements”

The  property was appraised at $419,200 in 2005.

While local desire to see the building redeveloped has been expressed, the difficulties of the undertaking have also been noted, including the large size of the property, the height of the floor plates, lack of adequate duct work, environmental issues, and the need to bring the building up to current seismic standards.

Further complications toward redevelopment include legal entanglements regarding the ground lease. The Sterick Building is a land lease property wherein the original builders leased the land the building stands on for 99 years without buying the land outright. The land and the building are currently owned separately. The land is owned by The Sterick LLC and the building's lease is held by AXA Equitable Life Insurance Company.

Acknowledging the difficulties of redeveloping such a large building, local preservationists also have expressed optimism that a redevelopment boom in downtown Memphis, particularly coupled with increasing residential growth in the neighborhood, may make the Sterick Building, with its height and views over the Mississippi River, a candidate for residential conversion to apartments or condominia. Preservationists have also noted the possibility of tax credits and possible conservation easements for developers.

In 1994, some shots of the movie, The Client were taken around this building.

Gallery

See also
 National Register of Historic Places listings in Shelby County, Tennessee

References

External links
 Sterick Building at Night, Rhodes College Digital Depository

Skyscraper office buildings in Memphis, Tennessee
Office buildings on the National Register of Historic Places in Tennessee
Commercial buildings completed in 1928
Office buildings completed in 1928
1928 establishments in Tennessee
National Register of Historic Places in Memphis, Tennessee